Thomas Moran "Spook" Dowler (July 3, 1908 – December 6, 1986) was an American football, basketball, and baseball player and coach of football and basketball.  He served as the head football coach at The College of William & Mary in 1935 and at the University of Akron in 1939 and 1940, compiling a career college football record of 10–13–5.  Dowler also coached the William & Mary men's basketball team from 1934 to 1937 and the Akron Zips men's basketball team in 1939–40, tallying a career college basketball mark of 30–43.  Dowler played football, basketball, and baseball at Colgate University. He played with the Brooklyn Dodgers in the National Football League (NFL) for two games in 1931.

Coaching career
William & Mary had not yet joined an athletic conference during Dowler's first two seasons as head basketball coach, but for his third and final season, the Tribe had become a member of the Southern Conference. Dowler holds the dubious distinction of being the only men's basketball coach in school history to guide his team to a winless season.  The Tribe went 0–13 in conference play and 0–18 overall during the 1936–37 season.  Dowler went 21–29 over his three years at William & Mary. He finished his one-year stint as basketball coach at Akron with a 9–14 record.

Later life and death
Dowler served in the United States Navy as a lietenant during World War II. He later resided in Atlanta and died on  December 6, 1986.

Head coaching record

Football

References

External links
 

1908 births
1986 deaths
American football quarterbacks
Akron Zips football coaches
Akron Zips men's basketball coaches
American men's basketball coaches
American men's basketball players
Brooklyn Tigers players
Colgate Raiders baseball players
Colgate Raiders football coaches
Colgate Raiders football players
Colgate Raiders men's basketball players
College men's basketball head coaches in the United States
William & Mary Tribe football coaches
William & Mary Tribe men's basketball coaches
United States Navy personnel of World War II
United States Navy officers
Sportspeople from Erie, Pennsylvania